Tor Aulin (10 September 1866, Stockholm – 1 March 1914, Saltsjöbaden) was a Swedish violinist, conductor and composer.

Biography

Aulin studied music at the Royal College of Music in Stockholm (1877-1883) under  and then in the Conservatory of Berlin (1884-1886) with Émile Sauret and Philipp Scharwenka. From 1889 to 1892 Aulin served as concertmaster of the Royal Swedish Opera in Stockholm. He went on to conduct the principal symphony orchestras of Stockholm and Gothenburg. In 1887 he formed the Aulin Quartet, the first full-time professional quartet in Sweden. It gained an excellent reputation. It disbanded in 1912.  Along with Wilhelm Stenhammar, Aulin spearheaded a revival in interest in the work of Franz Berwald, and as soloist he premiered some of Stenhammar's works for violin and orchestra.

Aulin composed a number of orchestral and chamber music works, including a violin sonata, three violin concertos, an orchestral suite, and many small pieces for the violin.

His sister, Laura Valborg Aulin (1860-1928), was a pianist and composer whose output included two string quartets, in F major and E minor, among other works.

List of compositions

With opus number

Violin Concerto Nº. 2, Opus 11 (exists in two versions)
Violin Concerto Nº. 3, Opus 14
4 Aqvareller, Opus 15
4 Pieces for Violin & Piano, Opus 16
Midsummer Dance for Violin & Piano, Opus 18
Lyric Poe for Violin & Piano, Opus 21
Master Olof, Opus 22 (1908)
Gotländska danser, Opus 23
Swedish Dances for Violin & Piano, Opus 30
4 Schwedische Tänze, Opus 32

Without opus number
Albumblatt
Little Suite for Violin & Piano
Polka characteristique
4 Serbian Folksongs
Wiegenlied

References

External links

Recording Four Watercolors, Op. 15 — Gregory Maytan, violin; Adam Bowles, piano *Luna Nova New Music Ensemble

1866 births
1914 deaths
19th-century classical composers
19th-century classical violinists
19th-century conductors (music)
20th-century classical composers
20th-century classical violinists
20th-century conductors (music)
20th-century Swedish male musicians
20th-century Swedish musicians
Concertmasters
Male classical violinists
Musicians from Stockholm
Romantic composers
Royal College of Music, Stockholm alumni
Swedish classical composers
Swedish classical violinists
Swedish conductors (music)
Male conductors (music)
Swedish male classical composers